Terry Allen Goodin (born December 31, 1966) is a former Democratic member of the Indiana House of Representatives, representing the 66th District from 2000 to 2020. Goodin was first elected to the Indiana House of Representatives in 2000. Goodin represents the citizens of Indiana House District 66 in the Indiana House of Representatives. Goodin served as the Minority Leader of the House for a partial term following the resignation of Scott Pelath. He was not re-elected to the position by the Democratic caucus.

When not engaged in his legislative responsibilities in Indianapolis or back in Indiana House District 66, Terry serves as superintendent of Crothersville Community Schools and raises beef cattle on the family farm.

Goodin is a graduate of Austin High School, earned his Bachelor of Arts and Master of Arts degrees from Eastern Kentucky University, and received his Doctor of Education degree from Indiana University.

References

External links
Indiana State Legislature - Representative Terry Goodin Official government website
Project Vote Smart - Representative Terry A. Goodin (IN) profile
Follow the Money - Terry Goodin
2008 2006 2004 2002 2000 campaign contributions

1966 births
21st-century American politicians
Eastern Kentucky University alumni
Indiana University Bloomington alumni
Living people
Democratic Party members of the Indiana House of Representatives